Afterlyfe (stylized as AftërLyfe) is the third studio album by American rapper Yeat. It was released on February 24, 2023 by Geffen Records, Field Trip Recordings, and Twizzy Rich. The follow-up to his EP Lyfë (2022), it contains a sole guest appearance from YoungBoy Never Broke Again as well as Yeat's alter egos Kranky Kranky & Luh Geeky. Production was handled by Yeat himself as well as BYNX of Working on Dying, Bugz Ronin, ChaseTheMoney, and others. AftërLyfe debuted and peaked at #4 on the Billboard 200, becoming Yeat's first top five and third top ten placement on the chart.

Background 
Prior to the album's release, Yeat said the album was not just "regular rap beats. It's a whole different new wave." He also expressed that he did not want "21 features on an album" and wanted "people just hearing me. I don't really need other people on my music"

Promotion
On December 6, 2022, Yeat announced that he would be touring 27 cities across the U.S. and Canada. The tour began on March 1, 2023, in Minneapolis, Minnesota, and will end on April 12 in Denver, Colorado. Some fans on social media reacted negatively to the announcement due to the lack of tour dates in Florida.

Critical reception

Slant Magazines Paul Attard noted that the album is "composed of demonic-sounding material with little attention paid to sequencing" and that it's "just Yeat himself slightly pitching his voice up or down an octave—that break up the slowly mounting monotony." Concluding his review, he adds that some tracks "display how one-dimensional his style can get when the material is spread too thin", however, he also notes that "despite these flaws, AftërLyfe confirms that in a sea of blatant copycats, Yeat remains a true original—albeit one who’s in desperate need of an editor."

Track listing 

Notes
 All songs are stylized in sentence case. In addition, any song title that contains the letter 'e' is replaced with 'ë', with the exception of "Nun I'd Change". For example, "No More Talk" is stylized as "No morë talk". If a song contains two or more 'e's, then only the first one is replaced. However, "Bettr Off" is stylized as "Bëttr 0ff", "Rave Party" is stylized as "Rav3 p4rty", and "Demon" in "Bad Bend/Demon" is stylized as "DëMON".
 "Rave Party" and "Mean Feen" credit 
 In the tracklist Yeat shared on Instagram, he additionally listed the iPhone app Talking Ben as a feature on "How It Go".
 "Heavyweight" contains background vocals from SeptembersRich.
 "Myself" contains additional vocals from the producer BNYX.

Charts

Notes

References 

2023 albums
Yeat albums
Geffen Records albums